The Saxon Class VIII 1 were early German 4-4-0 steam locomotives built for the Royal Saxon State Railways (Königlich Sächsische Staats-Eisenbahn) for express train services. The engines were deployed on the railway route between Dresden and Chemnitz.

They were based on a prototype from Württemberg. They were fitted with an American bogie and had a high outer firebox instead of the second steam dome. As a result, the boiler was also pitched higher.

These locomotives were over 50 years old when they were retired around 1922 by the Deutsche Reichsbahn before being given a new classification.

See also
Royal Saxon State Railways
List of Saxon locomotives and railbuses

Literature 

 

4-4-0 locomotives
08 1
Railway locomotives introduced in 1870
Standard gauge locomotives of Germany
2′B n2 locomotives

Passenger locomotives